The 25th Mechanized Infantry Regiment is an infantry unit of the Argentine Army belonging to the 9th Mechanized Brigade, 3rd Army Division, and based at Sarmiento, Chubut, Argentina. This Regiment was the first army unit to land in the Falkland Islands on 2 April 1982 and fought in the Falklands War.

History 
In 1943 the 25th Infantry Regiment was created as part of the Patagonia Group. It was first headquartered in the town of Las Heras, Santa Cruz. In December 1943 the town of Puerto Deseado became the barracks of the 25th Regiment. On 31 August 1943 the town of Sarmiento, Chubut became the long term barracks of the 25th Regiment, and is also shared with the 9th Armored Artillery Squadron.

In the mid-1970s the 25th Infantry Regiment deployed officers and other ranks in the fighting taking place in Tucumán Province between military/police units and left-wing guerrillas/radicals.

The 25th Regiment was a member of Group B that traveled to the Tucumán province by order of the Commanding General of the Army to reinforce the V Infantry Brigade that carried out Operation Independence. Group B took turns with Group A and C, created for the same purpose. 

In 1977, the 25th Infantry Regiment dispatched the Combat Team “Águila” to the city of Campana, Buenos Aires, to integrate with the Task Force “Campos”. The unit was made up of personnel from the three companies of the regiment and totaled 30 Officers and 141 soldiers.

Falklands War 

Operation Rosary was a conquest of the Falkland Islands by Argentina in 1982, by means of an amphibious and bloodless operation, due to the decision of the military junta that had governed the country since 1976. The archipelago had been under control of the United Kingdom since its occupation in 1833.

The Argentine soldiers pushed out the British authorities and established a military governance. The Argentine authorities, led by Leopoldo Galtieri, had planned the operation since December 1981. In March 1982, an expeditionary fleet set sail from the continent. The disembarkment began on April 2nd and was carried out without any major issues except for a death in the occupation of the Government palace. The Argentine commander reached his goal without causing injuries on the enemy or the civilians, something that the dictatorship had demanded for diplomatic negotiations. At the end, the Argentine forces defeated the reduced British garrison, which was deported along with Governor Rex Hunt.

On April 3rd, the United Nations Security Council passed Resolution 502, which ordered:

 The immediate cessation of hostilities
 The immediate withdrawal of all Argentine forces from the Falkland Islands
 The governments of Argentina and the United Kingdom to come to a diplomatic solution to their differences and to fully obey the aims and principles of the Charter of the United Nations

15 out of 30 countries voted in favor of the resolution, one more than the necessary minimum. The Argentine dictatorship did not expect this. With the exception of Panama, the members of the Movement of Non-Aligned Countries voted against Argentina while the Soviet Union, Spain, Poland, and China abstained.

That same Saturday April 3rd, the government of the United Kingdom launched Operation Corporate, under the care of Task Force 317, in order to recapture the archipelagos.

The 25th Regiment was the sole unit of the Argentine Army to take part in the amphibious landings that took place in the Falkland Islands on 2 April 1982, as part of Operation Rosario. A platoon of the 25th Regiment was detached to clear the obstructions on Stanley Airport in the form of abandoned vehicles and concrete blocks. During the Falklands War, the Commanding Officer, Lieutenant-Colonel Mohamed Alí Seineldín was entrusted with the defense of Stanley Airport. The 25th Regiment's C Company formed outposts at Goose Green and San Carlos, along with part of the 12th Infantry Regiment. On 1 May, a Sea Lynx assisting the Royal Navy ships in their bombardment of the Port Stanley defenders was taken by surprise by Second Lieutenant Guillermo Eduardo Laferriere's rifle platoon from the 25th Regiment that had been sent to Beagle Ridge and was reportedly hit by machine-gun fire.   

During the British landings on 21 May, a combat team from the 25th Regiment's C Company, under First Lieutenant Esteban shot down 2 Gazelle helicopter-gunships (armed with 68mm SNEB rockets and 7.62mm machine-guns) and severely damaged other two, while at Fanning Head part of that combat team, under Sub-Lieutenant Roberto Oscar Reyes were able to successfully evade encirclement by British SBS Commandos. On 11 June, a platoon of Royal Marines under Lieutenant Martin Howell from 40 Commando's B Company finally caught up with Sub-Lieutenant Reyes and surrounded and captured his platoon that had taken refuge in New House and Moss Side House. 

C Company suffered heavy casualties on Darwin Ridge and Goose Green Airbase, but forced the British attackers to withdraw twice in the battle before the Argentines surrendered. The Commanding Officer of 2 PARA, Lieutenant-Colonel Herbert Jones was killed on the hillside of Darwin Ridge by Corporal Osvaldo Faustino Olmos(a specialist sniper) from 'Boat Platoon' (Sección Bote) of the 25th Regiment although other versions say he was gunned down by two conscripts from the same rifle platoon, the OAR (Aspirante a Oficial de Reserva or Reserve Officer Trainees) Jorge Oscar Ledesma (machine-gunner) and Guillermo Nelson Huircapán (FAL rifleman and assistant-gunner). The commander of 'Boat' Platoon was Special Forces Lieutenant Roberto Néstor Estévez who was shot and killed while directing Argentine artillery and mortar fire. Lieutenant Colonel “H” Jones turned out to be the highest ranking British officer killed in the ground campaign.  

The 25th Regiment had received Commando training in 1981 and again in February/March 1982, according to the book The Military Sniper Since 1914 (Martin Pegler, Osprey Publishing, 2001), to seize and defend the Falklands. British Warrant Officer Nick Van Der Bijl, who interviewed several key Argentine POWs in the Falklands fighting has written:

Van Der Bijl even alleges that a mutiny was at one stage plotted, to replace Brigadier-General Mario Menéndez with Colonel Seineldín of the 25th 'Special' Infantry Regiment.

In his book Malvinas: Un Sentimiento (Editorial Sudamericana, 1999), Seineldín says that it was the Army Green Berets in 601 and 602 Commando Companies who urged him take charge of the Port Stanley garrison, which he rejected. British authors Max Hastings and Simon Jenkins in The Battle for the Falklands (Norton, 1983) wrote the following: "The Calvi report prepared by the Army after the war even suggests that a mutiny was plotted to replace Menéndez with Colonel Mohamed Alí Seineldín, from the 25th Infantry Regiment."

On the night of 13-14 June, the 25th (Ranger-type) Regiment deployed a mixed company force (under First Lieutenant Miguel Angel Machi) to halt the British advance at Moody Brook. In recognition to their role in the Falklands War, the regiment's battle flag was awarded the "Medalla de Campaña" of the Argentine Army, "To the flag that fought in the South Atlantic" of the Santa Fe Province and the Medal of the Municipality of Sarmiento.

In all, 35 conscripts and regulars were decorated, including many of the fallen and wounded, like Lieutenant Roberto Néstor Estévez, a platoon commander killed during the Battle of Goose Green.

References

Regiments of Argentina
Military units and formations of Argentina in the Falklands War
Military units and formations established in 1943